Oiticica may refer to:

People
Hélio Oiticica (1937–1980), Brazilian artist
José Oiticica (1882–1957), Brazilian anarchist
Christina Oiticica (born 1951), Brazilian artist

Other uses
Oiticica Dam, in Rio Grande do Norte, Brazil
Oiticica, common name for the tree Licania rigida